New Club is a football club of Martinique, based in the village Petit-Bourg in the commune Rivière-Salée.

Founded in 1948, they play in Martinique's second division, the Martinique Promotion d'Honneur.

External links
 2007/08 Club info – Antilles-Foot
 Club info – French Football Federation

References

New Club
New Club
1948 establishments in Martinique